The Roman Catholic Diocese of Bragança Paulista is a diocese located in the city of Bragança Paulista in the Ecclesiastical province of Campinas in Brazil.

History
 July 24, 1925: Established as Diocese of Bragança Paulista from the Diocese of Campinas and Metropolitan Archdiocese of São Paulo

Special churches
Minor Basilicas:
Basílica Nossa Senhora do Belém

Bishops
Bishops of Bragança Paulista (Latin Rite)
José Maurício da Rocha (1927.02.04 – 1969.11.24)
José Lafayette Ferreira Álvares (1971.02.01 – 1976.11.10)
Antônio Pedro Misiara (1976.10.27 – 1995.05.17)
Bruno Gamberini (1995.05.17 – 2004.06.02), appointed Archbishop of Campinas, São Paulo
José María Pinheiro (9 March 2005 – 16 September 2009)
Sérgio Aparecido Colombo (16 September 2009 – present)

Other priest of this diocese who became bishop
Jeremias Antônio de Jesus, appointed Bishop of Guanhães, Minas Gerais in 2012

References
 GCatholic.org
 Catholic Hierarchy
 Diocese website (Portuguese) 

Roman Catholic dioceses in Brazil
Braganca Paulista, Roman Catholic Diocese of
Christian organizations established in 1925
Roman Catholic dioceses and prelatures established in the 20th century